Matías Nicolás Arrúa (born 16 April 1983) was an Argentine footballer.

External links
 
 

1983 births
Living people
Argentine expatriate footballers
Argentine footballers
Unión de Mar del Plata footballers
Unión de Santa Fe footballers
Unión de Sunchales footballers
Deportes Temuco footballers
Curicó Unido footballers
Primera B de Chile players
Expatriate footballers in Chile
Association football forwards
Sportspeople from Mar del Plata